Nubra is one of the 87 constituencies in the Jammu and Kashmir Legislative Assembly of Jammu and Kashmir a north state of India. Nubra is also part of Ladakh Lok Sabha constituency.

Member of Legislative Assembly

Election results

2014

See also
 Leh district
 List of constituencies of Jammu and Kashmir Legislative Assembly

References

Leh district
Government of Ladakh
Former assembly constituencies of Jammu and Kashmir